Allerton is a village within the metropolitan borough of the City of Bradford, West Yorkshire, England, now increasingly part of the Bradford conurbation. With a population of around 12,000, the village is situated 3 miles west-north-west of Bradford.

Allerton was recorded in the Domesday Book as Wilsden-cum-Allerton. The local residents of the suburb pronounce it as Ollerton, 'Ol' rather than 'Al'.

Geography and history 

Allerton derives from Old English, and means an alder tree at a farm or settlement. Allerton is mentioned as a settlement worth 2 pounds, 10 shillings to the Lord, Ilbert of Lacy, in 1066. It is also known that the settlement was waste in the 11th century, probably due to the Harrying of the North that was led by William the Conqueror as a retaliation to Viking-influenced rebellions in the North of England at the time.

Chellow Dene is a local beauty spot at the north of Allerton. It is a wooded valley with two Victorian reservoirs, and is a haven for local wildlife. A significant amount of the village, mostly towards the south, was built in the decades following the Second World War as council housing and thus it contains over half of the population of the Thornton and Allerton ward, towards the west of Bradford.

In 1825, on the eastern fringes of the village with Bradford, the Bradford Public Dispensary opened at Darley Street, moved to Westgate as the Bradford Infirmary in 1843. The hospital became the Bradford Royal Infirmary (known as BRI to locals) in commemoration of Queen Victoria's Diamond Jubilee. This joined the National Health Service in 1948.

Seabrook Potato Crisps was founded in 1945 in Bradford and the company opened its first factory in Allerton in 1956 when Charles and Colin Brook converted the old Allerton liberal club into their factory.  The company's Allerton factory closed in 2004 and was finally demolished in 2015 following a fire, in 2016 an Aldi store was built on the site, production then moved to the company's Princeville site, also in Bradford.

A new housing development on the immediate western edge of the village - known as Heron's Reach - consisting of nearly 300 houses, began construction at the end of 2016. The development had previously been cancelled following opposition from local ward councillors and residents, and remains controversial, due to its situation on a green belt site.

Governance 
Allerton has been within the boundaries of the City of Bradford metropolitan borough since 1974 as part of the Thornton and Allerton electoral ward. It falls within the parliamentary constituency of Bradford West, a Labour safe seat. Allerton currently has three Labour councillors, who preside over the entire of the Thornton and Allerton wards, whose population primarily are within the village.

Notable people 
 Dean Cavanagh (born 1966), writer for screen, film and theatre
 Nicky Evans (born 1979), actor appearing as Roy Glover in Emmerdale and Shane Maguire in Shameless
 Kimberley Walsh (born 1981), singer from all-female band Girls Aloud

See also
Listed buildings in Thornton and Allerton, West Yorkshire

References

External links
 
 

Areas of Bradford